The European Cancer Organisation is a not-for-profit federation of 41 Member Societies working in cancer at a European level, together with 20 European Patient Advisory Committee members. The Organisation is dedicated to convening oncology professionals and patients to agree policy, advocate for positive change and speak for the European cancer community. The European Cancer Organisation is the organiser of the annual European Cancer Summit.

Mission statement 
The Mission of the European Cancer Organisation is to reduce the burden of cancer, improve outcomes and the quality of care for cancer patients, through multidisciplinarity and multiprofessionalism.
 
As the not-for-profit federation of member organisations working in cancer at a European level, the European Cancer Organisation convenes oncology professionals and patients to agree policy, advocate for positive change and be the united voice of the European cancer community.

Background and current organisation 
In the early 1980s, a few European visionaries working in oncology laid the grounds of multidisciplinarity in cancer care, entailing that tackling cancer was a team effort that required a coordinated approach. It was a relatively new concept at the time, but 40 years later, multidisciplinarity is viewed as the best approach cancer treatment.

It was consequently decided to bring together major players in cancer research, treatment, and care in order to create awareness of patients’ wishes and needs, encourage progressive thinking in cancer policy, education, and training, and continue to promote European cancer research and its application through the organisation of a multidisciplinary conference called ECCO - the European Conference on Clinical Oncology (later renamed ECCO-the European Cancer Conference).
To strengthen and further develop these ideas, in 1981 six professional societies, ESMO, ESTRO, ESSO, EACR, EONS, SIOPE legally founded FECS (Federation of European Cancer Societies).

After a period of reflection in 2006 and 2007, during which many players in oncology were consulted, FECS was transformed into a new dynamic entity: the European Cancer Organisation. This was officially announced at the European Cancer Conference in Barcelona in September 2007, where the organisation was launched under its new name.

At the General Assembly of the European Cancer Organisation in December 2019, a new Strategy for 2020-2023 was agreed.  This new strategy included two pillars:  Policy & Advocacy being the first pillar, achieving consensus among Member Societies and Patient Advocacy Groups and then advocating for those agreed policies.  The second pillar saw the creation of eight Focused Topic Networks which were launched during 2020.  These Networks are focused on Quality Cancer Care, HPV Action, Health Systems & Treatment Optimisation, Digital Health, Survivorship & Quality of Life, Workforce, Inequalities and Prevention.  A new Special Network was launched in June 2020 on the Impact of Covid-19 on Cancer.

In September 2020, the European Cancer Organisation launched the European Code of Cancer Practice, with ten overarching rights for patients developed by a collaboration between healthcare professions and patient advocates and translated into over 20 languages.  The EU Commissioner for Health and Safety, Stella Kyriakides, was part of the launch virtual event.

The European Cancer Organisation is run by a Board of Directors and Executive Committee.  The President for 2020-2021 was Matti Aapro, a medical oncologist based in Genolier, Switzerland. The President for 2022-2023 is Andreas Charalambous, associate professor at Cyprus University of Technology. The organisation has an office in Brussels, Belgium with a Chief Executive and a team of staff and consultants working in the areas of:  Policy & Advocacy, Communications & Community, Operations & Projects and Accreditation of Oncology Events.

References 

Organizations established in 2007
Cancer organisations based in Belgium
European medical and health organizations